Eastern Suburbs (now known as the Sydney Roosters) competed in the 13th New South Wales Rugby League (NSWRL) premiership in 1920.

Details

 Home Ground: Agricultural Ground
 Lineup:-

Results

premiership Round 1, Saturday 1 May 1920;
Balmain 9 (Potter try; Craig 3 goals defeated Eastern Suburbs 7 (Caples try; Messenger goal; Challis field goal) at the Sydney Cricket Ground.
Premiership Round 2, Saturday 8 May 1920;
Eastern Suburbs 19 (Wright 2, Cameron tries; Wally Messenger 3; Caples 2 goals) defeated Newtown 7 (Boys try; Boys goal) at the Agricultural Society Ground.
Premiership Round 3, Saturday 15 May 1920;
Eastern Suburbs 44 (Wright,  Warkins 2, Cameron, Messenger, Norman, Williams tries ; Messenger 7 goals) defeated University 8 (Callan, Satterthwaite tries) at Agricultural Society Ground.
Premiership Round 4, Saturday 22 May 1920
Eastern Suburbs 20 defeated Glebe 5 at Agricultural Ground.
Premiership Round 5, Saturday 29 May 1920;
Eastern Suburbs 18 defeated Western Suburbs  14 at Sydney Cricket Ground.
A crowd of 30,000 watched Easts defeat Wests.
Premiership Round 6, Thursday 17 June 1920;
Eastern Suburbs 42 defeated Annandale 10 at Sydney Cricket Ground No. 2
 
Premiership Round 7, Bye:

Premiership Round 8, Saturday 26 June 1920 Eastern Suburbs 12 defeated North 	Sydney 8 at Sydney Cricket Ground.

Premiership Round 9, Saturday 17 July 1920 - South Sydney 14 defeated Eastern 	Suburbs 11 at Agricultural Ground.

Premiership Round 10, Saturday 24 July 1920, 
Eastern Suburbs 30 Wright 5 + 1 Tries; 6 Goals) defeated Balmain 13 at the Agricultural Ground.
Eastern Suburbs were the only side to defeat Balmain in the 1920 season.
Premiership Round 11, Saturday 31 July 1920;
Newtown 8(???) defeated Eastern Suburbs 0 at Agricultural Ground;
Premiership Round 12, Saturday 7 August 1920;
North Sydney 21 defeated Eastern Suburbs 10 at Sydney Cricket Ground
Premiership Round 13, Saturday 21 August 1920 - Glebe 29 defeated Eastern 	Suburbs 21 at Sydney Cricket Ground.
Premiership Round 14, Saturday 28 August 1920 - Western Suburbs 29 	defeated Eastern Suburbs 5 at Sydney Cricket Ground; 
Premiership Round 15, Wednesday 1 September 1920;
Eastern Suburbs 15 	defeated Annandale 0 at Sydney Cricket Ground No.2.

Ladder

Season's highlights

Won Presidents Cup
Gordon Wright was once again the NSWRL's leading try scorer.
 Representatives:- Harry Caples (NSW), Sid Pearce (Australia, NSW).

References

External links
Rugby League Tables and Statistics

Sydney Roosters seasons
East